Paulson House may refer to:

Paulson House (Au Train, Michigan)
John E. and Christina Paulson House, Coquille, Oregon, listed on the National Register of Historic Places (NRHP)
Paulson-Gregory House, Newberg, Oregon, listed on the NRHP